Austrosticta frater is a species of damselfly in the family Isostictidae,
commonly known as a eastern pondsitter. 
It has been recorded only from northern Queensland, Australia, where it inhabits ponds and possibly streams.

Austrosticta frater is a medium-sized damselfly, dull grey-brown in colour with pale markings.

Gallery

See also
 List of Odonata species of Australia

References 

Isostictidae
Odonata of Australia
Insects of Australia
Endemic fauna of Australia
Taxa named by Günther Theischinger
Insects described in 1997
Damselflies